The Synagogue of Besançon is the principal Jewish place of worship in the city of Besançon, France. The building is located in the area of Battant, near the old center of the town. It was built in 1869 and was inaugurated on 18 November. Since 1984 the building has been listed as a historical monument.

A Jewish community formed in Free Imperial City of Besançon in the 14th century, after the expulsion of Jews from the Kingdom of France, but was forced to leave shortly thereafter. It did not reform until shortly after the French Revolution.

An Imperial Decree dated 22 May 1867 authorized the community to acquire land on the Quai Napoléon. The community then entrusted the local architect Pierre Marnotte with the commission to design a building "in the Moroccan style".

See also
 History of the Jews in Besançon

References 

Besançon
Moorish Revival synagogues
Buildings and structures in Besançon
Religion in Besançon